Sriram Balaji (born 18 March 1990) is an Indian professional tennis player. Balaji has a career high ATP singles ranking of world No. 287, achieved on 19 June 2017 and a doubles ranking of world No. 94 achieved on 30 January 2023. Balaji has won a total of 9 ITF singles titles on the futures circuit as well as 43 doubles ITF Futures and 6 Challenger doubles titles on the circuit. He is currently a member of the Indian Davis Cup team. 
He played his debut Davis cup partnering Rohan Bopanna in March 2017 making India win 3–0 and enter into Davis Cup World Play off.

Personal life
Sriram was born to Narayanaswamy and Jayanthi Narayanaswamy in Coimbatore. He started playing tennis at the age of nine. He succeeded his schooling from Kendriya Vidyalaya and PERKS Matriculation Higher Secondary School in Coimbatore. He started his tennis career at PERKS Tennis Academy, Coimbatore. He is currently getting trained at Schüttler-Waske Tennis University in Germany. His hobbies are swimming and reading books. His favorite tennis player is Roger Federer. Balaji is presently a Junior Officer in the Indian Army. The Army has supported his sports endeavours.

Junior career
 Represented India for the Nike International Masters Tennis Tournament held at Sun City, South Africa during November 2002 and Won Three Countries and obtained ninth position in the Team event.
 Ranked No.1 in National Level Competition Under 14 age Category during April – September 2004.
 Represented India for the Asia/Oceania Qualifying, World Junior Tennis Competition held at Melbourne, Australia during MAY 10 – 15, 2004. 16 Countries participated and obtained 11th Position in Team event.
 Represented India for Junior Davis Cup Tournament held at Kuching, Malaysia during April 2006.
 Participated in 15th Asian Games, Youth Camp during 28 November to 9 December 2006 held at Doha, Qatar.

Career
Balaji made his ATP main draw debut at the 2012 Aircel Chennai Open in the doubles event, partnering Jeevan Nedunchezhiyan. The wildcard pairing put up a good fight, but lost to the second seeds Scott Lipsky and Rajeev Ram 5–7, 4–6.

At the 2014 Aircel Chennai Open, Balaji was given a wildcard into the doubles event with Ramkumar Ramanathan. The Indian pair defeated Lipsky and Ram, who Balaji had lost to in 2012, 7–5, 6–3. In the quarterfinals the pair lost to Croatian-duo Marin Draganja and Mate Pavić, 3–6, 3–6.

Balaji joined the Mumbai Tennis Masters team for Champions Tennis League India.

He reached his first ATP final at the 2023 Tata Open Maharashtra with compatriot Jeevan Nedunchezhiyan as an alternate pair. They defeated compatriots Purav Raja and Divij Sharan in straight  sets in first round. In the quarterfinals, they upset second seeds Nathaniel Lammons and Jackson Withrow in straight sets winning both sets in a tiebreak. Next they defeated British pair of Jack Cash and Henry Patten in the semifinals in straight sets to reach their first ATP Tour final as a team. Despite not losing a single set on their way to final they were defeated in straight sets by Sander Gillé and Joran Vliegen in the final.

ATP career finals

Doubles: 1 (1 runner-up)

Challenger and Futures finals

Singles: 23 (9–14)

Doubles: 84 (52–32)

References

External links

1990 births
Living people
Tamil sportspeople
Indian male tennis players
People from Coimbatore
Racket sportspeople from Tamil Nadu
Kendriya Vidyalaya alumni
South Asian Games gold medalists for India
South Asian Games silver medalists for India
South Asian Games medalists in tennis